Rudolph Charles von Ripper (January 29, 1905 – July 9, 1960) (born Rudolph Carl von Ripper, sometimes Rudolph Ripper), known as Rip or Jack the Ripper, was an Austrian-born American surrealist painter and illustrator, soldier and Office of Strategic Services agent.

Life

Early life 

Rudolph von Ripper was born in 1905 in Cluj, at the time in Austria-Hungary and now in Romania. He was the son of an Austrian baron and general who was the last aide de camp to Charles I of Austria.  After his father's death and the collapse of the Austro-Hungarian empire, he ran away from home and worked in various jobs including as a coal miner and a circus clown, before studying art at the Kunstakademie Düsseldorf.

Paris and the French Foreign Legion 

He then moved to Paris, where in 1925, aged 19, he joined the French Foreign Legion. He served in the Legion for two years, being deployed against the Great Syrian Revolt, where he was wounded in action.

Berlin, Shanghai and Mallorca 

He then deserted the legion, and moved to Berlin, before traveling to Shanghai in 1928 as a filmmaker. On his return to Berlin in 1929, he began a relationship with stage designer . She was also in love with surrealist writer René Crevel, who also had feelings for von Ripper, and for a time there was a plan for a ménage à trois; however, this did not come about, and Sternheim and von Ripper married on 17 December 1929.

The couple settled in Berlin, where they were part of the decadent Weimar culture of the city in the early 1930s. However, at some point during the 1930s the couple separated and Sternheim began seeing other men and women. Around 1933, von Ripper traveled to Mallorca, where he produced anti-fascist drawings to the commission of the German resistance.

Concentration camp 

In October 1933, von Ripper returned via Paris to Berlin, now under Nazi rule, bringing with him copies of the Brown Book of the Reichstag Fire and Hitler Terror (Braunbuch), an anti-Nazi publication written by German left-wing groups in exile and published in Paris. He was taken to the office of Gestapo chief Rudolf Diels, and accused of high treason for his production of anti-Nazi cartoons and possession of anti-Nazi pamphlets.

He was imprisoned and tortured for some months in Oranienburg concentration camp, until in 1934 he managed to get a message to Austrian Chancellor Engelbert Dollfuss, who intervened to have him released, with a requirement to leave all Nazi-held territories.

Return to Mallorca and Spanish Civil War 

He returned, via Amsterdam and Paris, to Mallorca, where he created a series of pieces. In October 1935, fourteen of these pieces were exhibited at the Tooth Gallery in London under the title "Kaleidoscope", and according to the New York Times "created a sensation in the art world". The German ambassador asked that the show be censored, but British authorities refused. The drawings for the exhibition were intended for publication, but the originals disappeared from the printer. von Ripper recreated the pictures as etchings on copper plates, which were published in Paris in a limited edition in 1938 under the title Ecrasez l'infame (To Crush Tyranny), a reference to Voltaire.

After the outbreak of the Spanish Civil War in 1936, in which General Francisco Franco's coup was supported by troops from Nazi Germany, von Ripper joined the Republican Army, with the specific aim of fighting the Germans. In 1937, he was serving as an aerial gunner in the Spanish Republican Air Force when his plane was shot down and his left leg riddled with metal from a shell. He was told by doctors that his leg would have to be amputated, but left before they could do so.

Move to the United States, Time and Fortune magazines 

In 1938, his health too damaged to fight further, he traveled to New York City, where he settled for a while in Greenwich Village and he held exhibitions at the A.C.A and Bignou galleries. In 1939, he earned a residency at the Yaddo artists' community, before moving to New Canaan, Connecticut where he established an art studio in a century-old barn.

In January 1939, Time used von Ripper's picture captioned 'From the unholy organist, a hymn of hate', from Ecrasez l'infame, on the front cover of the issue which named Adolf Hitler as 1938's Man of the Year.

The issue also contained a profile of von Ripper and his art, under the heading 'Art: Enemy of the State'. Another picture by von Ripper, depicting Nikolaus von Falkenhorst, was used on the cover of Time magazine on May 13, 1940. During this period his art also began to appear in Fortune magazine. In 1939, he produced illustrations for Norman Corwin's book Seems Radio is Here to Stay, and in 1940 collaborated with Muriel Rukeyser on a long illustrated poem, The Soul and Body of John Brown.

In 1941, Rudolph and Mopsa were officially expelled from the German Empire.

US Army and OSS service 

When the United States joined World War II, in 1941, von Ripper attempted to join the army as a soldier, but was initially rejected due to his health. Meanwhile, he painted propaganda posters intended for distribution abroad for the Office of War Information.

Eventually, on September 5, 1942, he was admitted to the United States Army for 'limited service only' due to his wounds, and initially served as a hospital laboratory technician. He received basic medical training at William Beaumont Army Medical Center, El Paso, Texas, where he painted a still-surviving mural captioned "Our Country's Freedom and Its Peoples Way of Life the Soldier and Sailor Protects". On the formation of the Corps of Engineers War Art Unit in 1943, he transferred to that unit and was sent to North Africa as an Artist Correspondent alongside Mitchell Siporin. Also in 1943, he became a United States citizen, and anglicized his middle name to Charles.

He worked alongside Pulitzer Prize-winning journalist Ernie Pyle, who in his 1944 book Brave Men wrote:

The Army Artist Unit was dissolved in May 1943, and von Ripper transferred to the Intelligence Section to interrogate prisoners.  He was assigned to the 34th Infantry Division, with whom he took part in the Invasion of Italy. In the 34th he acquired the nickname "Jack the Ripper". In Italy, he served as acting intelligence officer of the 2nd Battalion of the 168th Infantry Regiment.  He also led patrols against Nazi positions, either with squads of soldiers or alone. For actions in these sorties he was awarded a Silver Star and oak leaf cluster, and on December 12, 1943 was promoted to first lieutenant, which fellow artist Sergeant Mitchell Siporin described as 'a battlefield appointment about which much should be said'. He also received a Purple Heart and Silver Star with oak leaf cluster and a Division Citation.

In a later sortie, he was ambushed and wounded in his right hand, left leg and face by machine gun bullets. He was taken to Naples to recover, where he continued to work on paintings based on his front line sketches. He became sufficiently known for his audacity when leading patrols that his division forbade him going on patrol without specific permission.

In December 1943, his art was included in The Army at War, a War Department exhibition of combat art. Writing in the catalog for the exhibition, von Ripper wrote:

In February 1944 he returned to the front lines and was involved in the Battle of Monte Cassino. His exploits drew the attention of Office of Strategic Services (OSS) director William J. Donovan, and he was recruited for its Secret Intelligence Branch. He parachuted into Austria early in 1945 to organize resistance and inform the OSS about the situation. 

After the war ended, von Ripper was involved in finding Gestapo and Nazi officials hiding in Austria. OSS agent Franklin Lindsay would later describe how von Ripper carried out a one-man hunt in the mountains behind Salzburg, leaving each morning dressed in lederhosen and carrying a hunting rifle, and returning each evening, usually with two or three Nazi prisoners he had found hiding in the forest.

After the war 

He left the OSS in late 1945 with the rank of captain, though some commentators suggest he continued as an operative for the Central Intelligence Agency. His final official evaluation form assessed him as "Outstanding in fieldwork but too restless for staff work". He returned to Europe in 1946 and taught at the Academy of Fine Arts in Vienna, where he was involved with the Art-Club artists' association, often raising funds for their activities.

Around this time he obtained a divorce from Mopsa, and married art critic Evelyn Leege, with whom he returned to his pre-war home in Connecticut. He earned two Guggenheim Fellowships for fine art painting, in 1945 and 1947.

In 1947, a portfolio of thirty of von Ripper's etchings was published in New York in 200 numbered editions, under the title "With the 34th Infantry Division in Italy" with a foreword from Major General Charles W. Ryder. The same year, his wartime painting Smoke Screen at Anzio Beachhead was lent by the Department of Defence to hang in the United States Capitol.

In 1950, Rudolph and Evelyn moved to a villa called Ca'n Cueg (House of the Frogs) near Pollença on Mallorca, despite the island still being under the Francoist regime that von Ripper had fought against in the 1930s. Their house became known for hosting glamorous parties with international guests. Shortly afterwards, former Nazi officer Otto Skorzeny moved in nearby.

In 1960, returning from a four-month trip, von Ripper was arrested by Spanish police and charged with smuggling. His wartime comrade C. L. Sulzberger, who had cautioned him against returning to Mallorca, believed that this might be the Spanish regime seeking revenge against him.

Death 

On July 9, 1960, while on bail awaiting trial, von Ripper stepped outside the villa. He was found dead the following morning by Evelyn, with his death recorded as being from a heart attack, though some commentators including biographer Sian Mackay have considered the death suspicious. His obituary in the New York Times was headed, "Rudolf von Ripper, Artist, Dies; War Hero Served With O. S. S.". He is buried in the cemetery at Pollença.

In the 1990s, workers clearing out the Ca'n Cueg villa found a large number of papers and sketches belonging to von Ripper, which formed the basis of Sian Mackay's book Von Ripper’s Odyssey: War, Resistance, Art and Love.

Literature 

 Klaus Mann: Écrasez l’infâme (1936), republished in Das Wunder von Madrid. Rowohlt Verlag, Reinbek b. Hamburg 1993, pp. 232–236.
 C. L. Sulzberger: Unconquered Souls. The Resistentialists. Woodstock, Overlook Press, 1973
 S. Koja, C. Tinzl: Rudolf Charles von Ripper – Werk und Widerstand. Ausstellungskat. Linz, Salzburg 1989
 Dietmar Horst: Der Tänzer auf den Wellen – Das merkwürdige Leben des Rudolf Charles von Ripper. Berenkamp Verlag, Hall/Wien, 2010
 Dietmar Horst: Der letzte große Romantiker. In: Salzburger Nachrichten, 2010, S. VII (Beilage)
 Jörg Deuter, Gert Schiff: Von Füssli zu Picasso. Biographie einer Kunsthistoriker-Generation. Weimar, 2013. pp. 160–165.
 Sian Mackay: Von Ripper’s Odyssey: War, Resistance, Art and Love. Thistle Publishing, London. 2016

Notes

References 

1905 births
1960 deaths
Artists from Cluj-Napoca
20th-century American painters
20th-century Austrian painters
20th-century American male artists
American male painters
Soldiers of the French Foreign Legion
Foreign volunteers in the Spanish Civil War
Military personnel of the Spanish Civil War
Shot-down aviators
American war correspondents of World War II
People of the Office of Strategic Services
Austrian emigrants to the United States
United States Army artists
People of the United States Office of War Information
United States Army personnel of World War II
United States Army officers
Austrian expatriates in France
Austrian expatriates in Germany
Austrian expatriates in Spain